The 1619 Project is an American streaming documentary television series created for Hulu. It is adapted from "The 1619 Project" anthology published by The New York Times Magazine, which was turned into The 1619 Project: A New Origin Story, a bestselling book. Hosted by project creator Nikole Hannah-Jones, the executive producer of the docuseries is Oprah Winfrey, who worked with documentary filmmaker Roger Ross Williams, and many other producers and writers. It is a six-episode program produced by Lionsgate Television, which first aired on Hulu on January 26, 2023.

Background 
The premise of The 1619 Project is that the arrival of the first slave ship in the early American colonies is the "true" national origin story of the United States. In exploring this thesis, the project aims to demonstrate that slavery has shaped every aspect of American life since then, from policing to justice to capitalism, and that recognition of this fact is essential for social progress.

According to Jake Silverstein, editor-in-chief of The New York Times Magazine, work on turning the content into a television documentary began more than three years before its release. Following the success of the original project, which was published in the magazine, in a special broadsheet section, and as a podcast, the project aimed to reimagine the series in a new format and reach millions of viewers.

Format 
In the docuseries, Hannah-Jones appears both on-camera and in voice-over. The episodes shift between interviews, analyses of American history and culture, and Hannah-Jones' own personal story as a biracial woman growing up in the United States. Each of the six episodes focuses on a different facet of Black life in America, such as "Democracy", "Race", "Fear", "Justice", "Music", and "Capitalism".

Critical reception 
The 2023 television series received mixed reviews. Several critics acknowledged that "The 1619 Project" might seem overexposed, with Judy Berman of Time magazine saying, "it's fair to ask whether the TV series is overkill" following the publication of the book, the curriculum, and the podcast since the project first launched in 2019. Nevertheless, both Berman and C. T. Jones of Rolling Stone praised the docuseries, with Jones stating, "It succeeds both technically and as a piece of art, skillfully weaving shots of Black Americans with firsthand accounts, explanations, interviews and stories that have been consistently omitted from the historical record." 

Acknowledging the right-wing backlash against The 1619 Project, Berman argued that the TV series is "posed to spark fresh controversy" though many of the issues are covered so frequently in the news, "some episodes feel a bit remedial". Describing Nikole Hannah-Jones as an "ideal host" with "an appetite for making bold arguments", Berman wrote, "at its best, The 1619 Project makes astute – and highly personal – connections between the antebellum and pre-civil-rights past, and a present in which Black Americans still disproportionately face police violence, workplace exploitation, and other forms of inequality."

Critic Daniel Fienberg wrote in The Hollywood Reporter that "Hulu's adaptation remains cogent and persuasive, but in failing to sufficiently adapt its storytelling to the visual demands and possibilities of TV, it fails to make itself essential." Fienberg also complained that "each episode feels like the summarizing of an essay". While acknowledging that Hannah-Jones sometimes "overstretches" and is "expansive to a fault" in her critique, Variety praised her "skill with interview subjects and her deftness at drawing small but crucial connections."

References 

American television series
2023 American television series debuts
Onyx Collective original programming
Television series about the history of the United States